Colostethus agilis is a species of frog in the family Dendrobatidae. It is endemic to Colombia. Its natural habitats are subtropical or tropical moist montane forests and rivers.

Description
The head is wide and the snout short. The tympanum, situated just behind the eye, is half covered by a fold of skin. There are some white specks on the upper lip and the iris is bronze with yellow specks. The dorsal and lateral surfaces have several longitudinal rows of warts and the general colour is olive or deep brown with darker coloured blotches. The ventral surface and the underside of the thighs are pale with yellowish blotches. There are discs on the tips of the fingers of the fore feet and smaller ones on the hind feet. Colostethus agilis is one of only five species of Colostethus that have fully webbed hind feet, the others being Colostethus chocoensis, Colostethus fuliginosus, Colostethus palmatus and Colostethus vergeli.

Distribution
Its range extends from La Serrania de los Paraguas southwards to the Munchique National Natural Park, and it inhabits the floors of moist forests and the streams that flow through them.

Status
The IUCN Red List of Threatened Species includes Colostethus agilis as "Endangered". The main threats it faces are forestry activities, the conversion of woodland to agricultural uses (including illegal crops) and pollution of the streams in which it is believed to breed.

References

Agilis
Amphibians of Colombia
Amphibians of the Andes
Amphibians described in 1985
Taxonomy articles created by Polbot